Taskmaster is a British comedy panel game show created by comedian and musician Alex Horne and presented by both Horne and Greg Davies. In the programme, a group of five celebritiesmainly comediansattempt to complete a series of challenges, with Horne acting as umpire in each challenge, and Davies judging the work and awarding points based on contestants' performances. The concept for the programme was first created by Horne for the Edinburgh Festival Fringe in 2010; he later secured a deal with Dave to adapt it for television, with the first episode premiering in 2015. After the ninth series in 2019, the programme was acquired by Channel 4, who commissioned six new series to be broadcast over the following three years.

Series overview

Main series

Series 1 (2015)
The first series was aired during 2015 on Dave for six episodes, between 28 July to 1 September. The contestants for this series were Frank Skinner, Josh Widdicombe, Roisin Conaty, Romesh Ranganathan and Tim Key, with the series' overall winner being Widdicombe – both Skinner and Ranganathan tied as runner-ups, Key placed fourth, and Conaty finished in last place. During its broadcast, the series averaged over 420,000 viewers. Following his participation, Key later went on to provide assistance with production of the programme in future series.

For the team tasks, the team of three consisted of Widdicombe, Conaty and Ranganathan, while the team of two consisted of Skinner and Key.

Series 2 (2016)
The second series was broadcast during 2016 for five episodes, between 21 June to 19 July. This series started the tradition of awarding a golden trophy of Greg Davies' head, unlike the previous season's prize, won by Josh Widdicombe, which had been a generic sports trophy. The contestants for this series were Doc Brown, Joe Wilkinson, Jon Richardson, Katherine Ryan and Richard Osman, with the series' overall winner being Ryan – Richardson ended as the runner-up, Osman placed 3rd, Brown placed 4th, and Wilkinson finished last. During its broadcast, the series averaged over 710,000 viewers.

For the team tasks, the team of three consisted of Ryan, Brown and Wilkinson, while the team of two consisted of Osman and Richardson.

Previous contestant Josh Widdicombe appeared in episode 3 to aid Osman and Richardson in a team task.

Series 3 (2016)
The third series was broadcast during 2016 for five episodes, between 4 October to 1 November; it was initially planned for 2017, but was aired earlier due to improved viewing figures for the programme after the second series. The contestants for this series were Al Murray, Dave Gorman, Paul Chowdhry, Rob Beckett and Sara Pascoe, with the series' overall winner being Beckett – Gorman ended as the runner-up, Murray placed 3rd, Pascoe placed 4th, and Chowdhry finished last. During its broadcast, the series averaged over 930,000 viewers.

For the team tasks, the team of three consisted of Murray, Gorman and Chowdhry, while the team of two consisted of Beckett and Pascoe.

Broadcaster and writer Ben Fogle made a cameo appearance in episode 5 due to coincidentally being in the same location during filming of a task.

Series 4 (2017)
The fourth series was broadcast during 2017 for eight episodes, between 25 April to 13 June. The contestants for this series were Hugh Dennis, Joe Lycett, Lolly Adefope, Mel Giedroyc and Noel Fielding, with the series' overall winner being Fielding – Lycett ended as the runner-up, Giedroyc placed 3rd, Dennis placed 4th, and Adefope finished last. During its broadcast, the series averaged over 800,000 viewers.

For team tasks, the team of three was made up of Lycett, Adefope and Fielding, with the team of two consisting of Dennis and Giedroyc.

Former series 3 contestant Al Murray made a cameo in episode 3, and former series 1 contestant Tim Key made a cameo in episode 8.

Series 5 (2017)
The fifth series was broadcast during 2017 for eight episodes, between 13 September to 1 November. The contestants for this series were Aisling Bea, Bob Mortimer, Mark Watson, Nish Kumar and Sally Phillips, with the series' overall winner being Mortimer – both Watson and Phillips tied as the runner-up, Bea placed 4th, and Kumar finished last. During its broadcast, the series averaged over 700,000 viewers.

For team tasks, the team of three was made up of Bea, Mortimer and Phillips, with the team of two consisting of Watson and Kumar.

Champion of Champions (2017)
In September 2017, a two-part special titled "Champion of Champions" was announced, aimed at putting the first five winners – Bob Mortimer, Josh Widdicombe, Katherine Ryan, Noel Fielding and Rob Beckett - for a series of new tasks, with the winner receiving a life-size trophy based on Davies' headless body – designed to attach the winner's trophy from their series on the neck. The special, which featured no team tasks, was aired later that year: the first part on 13 December; and the second part a week later, on 20 December.

The special's overall winner was Widdicombe – Beckett ended as the runner-up, Ryan placed 3rd, Fielding placed 4th, and Mortimer finished last. During its broadcast, the special averaged over 800,000 viewers.

Series 6 (2018)
The sixth series was broadcast during 2018 for ten episodes, between 2 May to 4 July. The contestants for this series were Alice Levine, Asim Chaudhry, Liza Tarbuck, Russell Howard and Tim Vine, with the series' overall winner being Tarbuck – Vine ended as the runner-up, Howard placed 3rd, Chaudhry placed 4th, and Levine finished last. During its broadcast, the series averaged over 810,000 viewers.

For team tasks, the team of three consisted of Chaudhry, Tarbuck and Vine, while the team of two was made up of Levine and Howard.

Series 7 (2018)
The seventh series was broadcast during 2018 for ten episodes, between 5 September to 7 November. The contestants for this series were James Acaster, Jessica Knappett, Kerry Godliman, Phil Wang and Rhod Gilbert, with the series' overall winner being Godliman – Knappett ended as the runner-up, Gilbert placed 3rd, Acaster placed 4th, and Wang finished last. During its broadcast, the series averaged over 1.2 million viewers.

For team tasks, the team of three was made up of Acaster, Wang and Gilbert, with the team of two consisting of Knappett and Godliman.

Previous contestant Richard Osman appeared in episode 5 as part of Acaster's attempt at a task.

Series 8 (2019)
The eighth series was broadcast during 2019 for ten episodes, between 8 May to 10 July. The contestants for this series were Iain Stirling, Joe Thomas, Lou Sanders, Paul Sinha and Sian Gibson, with the series' overall winner being Sanders – Stirling ended as the runner-up, Thomas placed 3rd, Gibson placed 4th, and Sinha finished last. During its broadcast, the series averaged over 1.36 million viewers, the highest viewed series of the programme during its time on Dave.

For team tasks, the team of three was made up of Stirling, Sanders and Sinha, with the team of two consisting of Thomas and Gibson.

Previous contestant Romesh Ranganathan appeared as part of Thomas and Gibson's attempt at a task in episode 5.

Series 9 (2019)
The ninth series was broadcast during 2019 for ten episodes, between 4 September to 6 November, and was the last series to be aired on Dave, before its move to Channel 4 the following year. The contestants for this series were David Baddiel, Ed Gamble, Jo Brand, Katy Wix and Rose Matafeo; due to illness, Wix was unable to attend filming of the studio segments for the fifth and sixth episodes, leading to former contestants Kerry Godliman and Katherine Ryan each standing in for these periods respectively. The series' overall winner was Gamble – Matafeo ended as the runner-up, Wix placed 3rd, Brand placed 4th, and Baddiel finished last. During its broadcast, the series averaged over 1.33 million viewers.

For team tasks, the team of three was made up of Gamble, Wix and Matafeo, with the team of two consisting of Baddiel and Brand, although this changed for a live task, with Baddiel and Gamble paired up.

Series 10 (2020)
The tenth series consisted of ten episodes and was the first series to be broadcast on Channel 4, broadcast between 15 October and 17 December 2020. Production on the series was affected by the outbreak of the COVID-19 pandemic and was therefore the first to be filmed without a studio audience. The majority of the tasks had been filmed prior to UK going into lockdown, but some team tasks were modified to follow social distancing. The panellists were Daisy May Cooper, Johnny Vegas, Katherine Parkinson, Mawaan Rizwan and Richard Herring.

For most team tasks, the team of three was made up of Vegas, Parkinson and Rizwan and the team of two was made up of Cooper and Herring, although these teams changed for some live tasks.

Herring was the overall winner, with Cooper as runner-up, Rizwan in 3rd, Vegas in 4th and Parkinson finishing last.

During its broadcast, the series averaged over 2.83 million viewers, an improvement on previous figures as a result of its move to a channel with a broader audience.

New Year Treat (2021)
A one-off festive special of Taskmaster was announced following the tenth series, and aired on 1 January 2021 under the title Taskmaster's New Year Treat. The special consisted of one episode and there were no team tasks. The special's contestants were John Hannah, Krishnan Guru-Murthy, Nicola Coughlan, Rylan Clark-Neal and Shirley Ballas.

Ballas was the overall winner, with Clark-Neal as runner-up, Guru-Murthy in 3rd, and Coughlan and Hannah tied last.

Series 11 (2021)
The eleventh series was broadcast during 2021 with the usual ten-episode format, from 18 March to 20 May, and the contestants for that series were Charlotte Ritchie, Jamali Maddix, Lee Mack, Mike Wozniak and Sarah Kendall.

For team tasks in this series, the team of three was made up of Ritchie, Maddix and Kendall and the team of two was made up of Mack and Wozniak.

Kendall was the overall winner, with Wozniak as runner-up, Mack in 3rd, Maddix in 4th, and Ritchie finishing last.

As Britain was still dealing with the COVID-19 pandemic and maintaining strict social distancing guidelines, filming was done in compliance with these, with virtual audiences allowed to watch complete footage and their laughter tracks recorded for the final edit of an episode before it is broadcast.

During its broadcast, the series averaged over 2.71 million viewers.

Series 12 (2021)
The contestants for the twelfth season were announced on 20 May 2021. The line-up includes Alan Davies, Desiree Burch, Guz Khan, Morgana Robinson and Victoria Coren Mitchell. It began airing from 23 September 2021.

Robinson was the overall winner, with Khan as runner-up, Burch and Davies tied in 3rd, and Coren Mitchell finishing last.

For team tasks in this series, the team of three was made up of Burch, Khan and Robinson and the team of two was made up of Davies and Coren Mitchell.

During its broadcast, the series averaged over 2.56 million viewers.

New Year Treat II (2022)
On 3 December 2021, Avalon announced that Taskmaster would have a second "New Year Treat" special, featuring Adrian Chiles, Claudia Winkleman, Jonnie Peacock, Lady Leshurr and Sayeeda Warsi. Due to illness, Peacock could not attend the studio recording, so Alan Davies was present in his place. The special was the first since Series 9 to include a studio audience and not have the contestants or hosts socially distanced.

Chiles was the overall winner, with Peacock as runner-up, Warsi in 3rd, Leshurr in 4th, and Winkleman finishing last.

Series 13 (2022)
Following the final of series 12 on 25 November 2021, the cast for the show's thirteenth series was announced, set to begin on 14 April 2022. Series 13 features Ardal O'Hanlon, Bridget Christie, Chris Ramsey, Judi Love and Sophie Duker.

For team tasks in this series, the team of three was made up of Christie, Love and Duker and the team of two was made up of O'Hanlon and Ramsey. 

Duker was the overall winner, with Ramsey as runner-up, Christie in 3rd, O'Hanlon in 4th, and Love finishing last.

During its broadcast, the series averaged over 2.06 million viewers.

Champion of Champions II (2022)
On 17 December 2020, Avalon announced that Taskmaster would have a second "Champion of Champions" special, featuring the winners from series 6–10Ed Gamble, Kerry Godliman, Liza Tarbuck, Lou Sanders and Richard Herring. The episode was aired on 23 June 2022, a week after the Series 13 final. Herring was the special's overall winner, with Tarbuck placing second, Godliman and Sanders tying for third, and Gamble finishing last.

Previous contestant James Acaster made a cameo appearance in Godliman's attempt at a task.

Series 14 (2022) 
Following the broadcast of Champion of Champions II on 23 June 2022, the cast for the show's fourteenth series was announced, to premiere on 29 September 2022. Series 14 features Dara Ó Briain, Fern Brady, John Kearns, Munya Chawawa and Sarah Millican.

For team tasks in this series, the team of three was made up of Ó Briain, Brady and Kearns, with the team of two consisting of Chawawa and Millican.

Ó Briain was the overall winner, with Millican as runner-up, Chawawa in 3rd and Brady and Kearns tied in last.

During its broadcast, the series averaged over 2.04 million viewers.

New Year Treat III (2023)
On 21 November 2022, it was revealed that the cast for the third New Year special would be Amelia Dimoldenberg, Carol Vorderman, Greg James, Mo Farah and Rebecca Lucy Taylor (Self Esteem).

Farah was the overall winner, with Dimoldenberg, Vorderman, James and Taylor all tied as runner-up.

Series 15 (2023)
Following the final of series 14 on 1 December 2022, the cast for the show's fifteenth series was announced. Series 15 features Frankie Boyle, Ivo Graham, Jenny Eclair, Kiell Smith-Bynoe and Mae Martin.

For team tasks in this series, the team of three was made up of Eclair, Smith-Bynoe and Martin, with the team of two consisting of Boyle and Graham.

Podcast

On 15 October 2020, an official podcast began. It is hosted by Ed Gamble, the winner of Series 9, who comments on each featured episode with a special guest. Initially it focused on Series 10, with each podcast released immediately after each Taskmaster episode was broadcast. Episode 12 of the podcast focused on the 2021 "New Year Treat", and then from episode 13 onwards it returned to the very beginning starting with Taskmaster Series 1 Episode 1, returned to "real-time" episodes during the broadcast run of series 11, 12 and NYT 2022 before returning to the older series after the newer series concluded.

Notes

References 

Lists of British comedy television series episodes
Taskmaster (TV series)